"Unbelievable" is a song written by Jeffrey Steele and Al Anderson, and recorded by American country music band Diamond Rio. It was released in October 1998 as the second single and title track from their album also titled Unbelievable.

The song was Diamond Rio's 21st single on the country music charts, and their first entry on the Billboard Hot 100.

Critical reception
Deborah Evans Price, of Billboard magazine reviewed the song favorably saying that the lyric is fun and the track "sparkles with the band's musicianship, from the frisky piano to the infectious guitar work." She also says that "one has to admire lead vocalist Marty Roe's ability to deliver the rapid-fire chorus without missing a syllable.

Music video
The music video was directed by Deaton Flanigen and premiered on September 10, 1998 on CMT.

Chart positions
"Unbelievable" debuted at number 51 on the U.S. Billboard Hot Country Singles & Tracks for the week of October 31, 1998.

Year-end charts

Parodies
On his 1999 album Juddmental, country music parodist Cledus T. Judd parodied the song as "She's Inflatable" (referring to an inflatable sex doll).

References

1998 singles
1998 songs
Diamond Rio songs
Songs written by Jeffrey Steele
Songs written by Al Anderson (NRBQ)
Music videos directed by Deaton-Flanigen Productions
Arista Nashville singles